Khoikhoicetus is an extinct genus of ziphiid cetacean known from skulls found on seafloor sediments of probable Miocene age off the coast of South Africa and the Kerguelen Islands.

Systematics
Two species are known, K. agulhasis and K. kergueleni. The genus Khoikhoicetus is closely related to beaked whales of the genera Mesoplodon, Hyperoodon, and Indopacetus. The two species differ from each other in their size and the width of the premaxillary crests.

References

Ziphiids
Prehistoric cetacean genera
Fossil taxa described in 2007
Miocene cetaceans